The Adelaide River is a river in the Northern Territory of Australia.

Course and features
The river rises in the Litchfield National Park and flows generally northwards to Clarence Strait, joined by eight tributaries including the west branch of the Adelaide River, Coomalie Creek, Margaret River and Marrakai Creek, before discharging into its mouth in Adam Bay in the Clarence Strait. The river descends  over its  course.

The Adelaide River is crossed by both the Stuart Highway, adjacent to the township of Adelaide River, and the Arnhem Highway near Humpty Doo.

The Adelaide River is well known for its high concentration of saltwater crocodiles, along with other wildlife including white-bellied sea eagles, whistling kites, freshwater crocodiles, bull sharks and black flying-fox. Its lower reaches form part of the Adelaide and Mary River Floodplains Important Bird Area. Waters of this river are also home to endangered speartooth shark and critically endangered largetooth sawfish.

History
Indigenous Australians including the Warray and Kungarakan owned the lands among the river for millennia.

Lieutenant Fitzmaurice, under the command of John Lort Stokes, sighted the river on a boating expedition. The expedition was part of the Admiralty surveying ship HMS Beagle's voyage in 1839, and the river was named in honour of Queen Adelaide.

Gallery

See also

List of rivers of Northern Territory
Naval Base Darwin

References

Rivers of the Northern Territory
Articles containing video clips